Luna is a census-designated place in northwestern Catron County, New Mexico, United States. As of the 2010 census it had a population of 158.

Demographics

History
In the 19th century Luna was part of the extensive lands of Don Salomon Luna, and the valley was used for sheep ranching. It briefly was an outlaw hide-away, but was settled by Mormon ranchers in 1883 and subject to Chiricahua Apache attacks until the surrender of Geronimo. The town was named after Don Salomon Luna.

The post office was opened in 1886;

Education
It is in the Reserve Independent School District.

Culture

"Mormon Pioneer Day" is celebrated on the Saturday closest to July 24 at the village rodeo grounds with a parade, rodeo and dance.

On the 4th of July, festivities are held as well as a cake making contest.

See also

 List of census-designated places in New Mexico

References

 Pearce, T. M. (1965) "Luna" New Mexico place names; a geographical dictionary University of New Mexico Press, Albuquerque, NM, p. 94, OCLC 420847
 Julyan, Robert Hixson (1998) "Luna" The place names of New Mexico (2nd ed.) University of New Mexico Press, Albuquerque, NM, p. 215,

External links

 Banks, Phyllis Eileen (30 December 2002) "Luna — holding on to history" Southern New Mexico dotcom

Census-designated places in Catron County, New Mexico
Census-designated places in New Mexico
Populated places established in 1883